The Sura Mosque is a sixteenth-century mosque in the village ChorGasa under Ghoraghat Upazila in Dinajpur District, Bangladesh.

Location and history
The Sura Mosque is situated in the village ChorGasa under Ghorahat Upazila in Dinajpur District, about 6 km from Upazila headquarters. There is no inscription tablet at the mosque, but it has been dated to the early sixteenth century in the light of its close links with dated monuments of similar style. An inscription from the time of Alauddin Hussain Shah, dated at 910 A. H./1504 A. D. was discovered in the village Champatali, a few miles away from the place. It records the construction of a mosque, and if this inscription describes the mosque at Sura, the year 1504 A. D. is the date of its construction.

Description 
The mosque stands on a raised mound of earth and is approached from the east by a flight of steps. It has a single dome over one large square room, and a verandah that has three domes. It has a 4.87 m square prayer chamber flanked on the east by a 1.82 m wide foreroom and measures externally 8.53 m by 12.50 m. At one time it was surrounded by high walls, which is a style otherwise unknown in Bengal.

The kiblah wall contains three semicircular mihrab niches with cusped arches, each set within an ornamented rectangular frame. The central mihrab is the largest of the three, and is of stone. The brick walls are faced with stone slab from within and the outside surfaces have some evidence of rich carving work of terracotta.

See also
 List of mosques in Bangladesh

References

Mosques in Bangladesh
Dinajpur District, Bangladesh
Religious buildings and structures completed in 1504
Archaeological sites in Dinajpur district